White Apples is a surreal fiction novel written by the American writer Jonathan Carroll, first published in 2002.

Synopsis 
White Apples tells the story of Vincent Ettrich, who is dead and brought back to life again. Ettrich slowly learns that he is brought back by his wife Isabelle and he is back to save his unborn son. Ettrich's unborn son will eventually save the universe if Ettrich can protect him from evil forces. This is a work of metaphysics and surrealism.

References

External links 
 Author's website

Novels by Jonathan Carroll
2002 American novels
Tor Books books